Don't Waste My Time may refer to:
"Don't Waste My Time" (The Angels song), 1986
"Don't Waste My Time" (Little Big Town song), 2002
"Don't Waste My Time" (Paul Hardcastle song), 1986
"Don't Waste My Time" (Status Quo song), 1972
"Don't Waste My Time" (Usher song), 2019
"Don't Waste My Time", a 2013 song by Krept and Konan from Young Kingz
"Don't Waste My Time", a 1993 song by Lisa Taylor
"Don't Waste My Time", a 1996 song by Sa-Deuce from Sa-Deuce